Kasey Smith (born 29 March 1990) is an Irish singer. Smith is a former member of the group Wonderland, which was mildly successful. She attempted to represent Ireland in the Eurovision Song Contest 2013 with the song "Kiss Me", ultimately placing third in the national final. The next year, she won Eurosong 2014 and got the chance to represent Ireland at the Eurovision Song Contest 2014 in Copenhagen, Denmark. She performed the song "Heartbeat" with the group Can-Linn but failed to make it to the final.

Personal life
Kasey first appeared on the music scene in 2008 when she successfully auditioned for Louis Walsh and Kian Egan's new girl band, Wonderland.

Kasey has a distinctive tattoo on her left arm that reads 'feel the fear and do it anyway.'

Discography

Singles

References

Eurovision Song Contest entrants for Ireland
Eurovision Song Contest entrants of 2014
Living people
1990 births
21st-century Irish singers
21st-century Irish women singers
People from Donaghmede